Netaji Jayanti or Netaji Subhas Chandra Bose Jayanti, officially known as Parakram  Diwas or Parakram Divas, is a national event celebrated in India to mark the birthday of the prominent Indian freedom fighter Netaji Subhas Chandra Bose. It is celebrated annually on 23 January. He played a pivotal role in Indian independence movement. He was the head of Indian National Army (Azad Hind Fouj). He was the founder-head of the Azad Hind Government.

Observances 
About 5 months after the disappearance of Netaji, the Netaji Jayanti was celebrated in Rangoon. It is traditionally observed in all over India. It is an official holiday in West Bengal, Jharkhand, Tripura, Assam and Odisha. The Government of India pays tribute to Netaji on this day. Netaji Jayanti was observed as Parakram Divas for the first time in 2021 on his 124th birth anniversary.

Issues 
The Forward Block and the family members of Subhas Chandra Bose demanded Government of India to declare Netaji Jayanti as Deshprem Divas (Day of Patriotism) and Mamata Banerjee demanded to declare it as Deshanayak Diwas (Day of National Hero) and a national holiday. But on 19 January 2021, the government has announced that it will be celebrated as Parakram Divas (Day of Valour) every year. The members of Netaji Subhas Chandra Bose's family, the ruling Trinamool Congress and the Left parties in West Bengal reacted sharply to the centre's decision to celebrate the icon's birth anniversary on 23 January as Parakram Diwas and not by the names they had proposed.

See also 

 Public holidays in India
 Netaji Subhas Vidyaniketan

References

External links 

 Netaji Jayanti (Deshprem Divas)
Netaji Subhas Chandra Bose Jayanti

Birthdays
Public holidays in India
January observances
Subhas Chandra Bose